The 1990–91 Courage League National Division Three was the fourth full season of rugby union within the third tier of the English league system, currently known as National League 1. The division was increased by one team and they each played one match against the other teams, playing a total of twelve matches each.

Participating teams and locations

League table

Sponsorship
National Division Three is part of the Courage Clubs Championship and is sponsored by Courage Brewery

See also
 English Rugby Union Leagues
 English rugby union system
 Rugby union in England

References

External links
 National Clubs Association

N3
National League 1 seasons